Jennifer A. McEwen (born May 14, 1977) is a Minnesota politician and member of the Minnesota Senate. A member of the Democratic-Farmer-Labor Party (DFL), she represents Senate District 7, which includes the city of Duluth in St. Louis County.

Early life, education, and career 
McEwen is a Duluth native who had received her B.A. from the University of Maine. She then attended the Hamline University School of Law, earning a J.D., after which she became an attorney for disabled workers and board president of the Damiano Center, where she has worked with families struggling with food security. McEwen is a member of the Democratic Socialists of America (DSA).

Minnesota State Senate 
In 2020, McEwen challenged incumbent Senator Erik Simonson for the DFL endorsement in District 7. She won the endorsement and the primary, with 77% of the vote. She then won the general election against Republican nominee Donna Bergstrom, a second-time candidate who ran against Simonson in 2016, with just over 68% of the vote. McEwen was reelected in 2022. In 2023, she wrote and sponsored the Protect Reproductive Options Act, which protects abortion rights in Minnesota, after Roe v. Wade was overturned in 2022. McEwen also wrote and supported legislation to reestablish passenger rail service between the Twin Cities and Duluth, the Northern Lights Express.

McEwen serves on the following committees:

 Ranking Minority Member: Labor and Industry Policy
 Environment and Natural Resources Policy and Legacy Finance
 Transportation Finance and Policy

See also
List of Democratic Socialists of America who have held office in the United States

Explanatory notes

References 

1977 births
Democratic Party Minnesota state senators
University of Maine alumni
Hamline University School of Law alumni
People from Duluth, Minnesota
Democratic Socialists of America politicians from Minnesota
Living people